The Women's Professional Soccer Player of Month is a monthly soccer award for players in Women's Professional Soccer.

The nominees are the Player of the week winners plus some proposals of WPS to usually get to 6 nominees. The voting is then open to media, fans and the teams with a waiting of 1/3 each.

Winners

See also

 List of sports awards honoring women

References

Women's Professional Soccer awards